Jason Schirnack (born 27 July 1989) is a New Zealand rugby league player who plays for the Rockhampton Leagues Club Capras in the local Queensland competition. He is the brother of Alan Schirnack.

Playing career
Schirnack played his first football with Te Aroha Eels before becoming a Newcastle Knights junior.

Schirnack made his first-grade with the Wests Tigers in round 2 of the 2010 season. It was his only appearance for the season, partly due to a lengthy injury. Returning to the NSW Cup with Balmain Ryde-Eastwood, Schirnack was involved in an incident where a piece of his ear was bitten off during a scuffle with an opposing player.

Near the start of the 2011 season, Schirnack made another 2 appearances from the bench, which were to be his last for the Wests Tigers club. He signed with the North Queensland Cowboys in October 2011, and played for their feeder team the Mackay Cutters in 2012.

In 2013, Schirnack played for the Mackay Cutters in the Queensland Cup and was a member of the side which won the QLD Cup that season. 

In 2015, Schirnack signed with the Canterbury Bankstown Bulldogs to play in their NSW Cup side.

In 2017, Schirnack played for Newtown in the Intrust Super Premiership NSW competition.

In 2018, Schirnack signed for the Rockhampton Leagues Club Capras.

References

External links
Wests Tigers profile

1989 births
New Zealand rugby league players
New Zealand Māori rugby league players
Wests Tigers players
Balmain Ryde-Eastwood Tigers players
Mackay Cutters players
Rugby league second-rows
Living people
People educated at St Bernard's College, Lower Hutt